Yangthang is a census village in West Sikkim district, Sikkim, India. As per the 2011 Census of India, Yangthang has a total population of 2,931 people including 1,506 males and 1,425 females.

Yangthang is an attraction of tourism. Buddhist Lamas are primary community of Yangthang.

References 

Gyalshing district